Leonid Nikolaevich Kulagin (born 1940) is a   Soviet and Russian actor, film director, screenwriter. People's Artist of the RSFSR (1986).

Selected filmography 
1967 — Beginning of the Unknown Century
 1969 — A Nest of Gentry
 1971 — Listen to the Other Side
 1972 — Privalov's Millions
 1973 — Cities and Years
 1974 — Autumn (1974 film)
 1975 — My Home — Theater
 1979 — Autumn Story
 1980 — Karl Marx. Young Years 
1983 — The Ballad of the Valiant Knight Ivanhoe
 1984   — Lets the Charms Last Long
 1985 — Black Arrow
 1985 — Battle of Moscow
 1986 —  Interception 
 1988 — The Adventures of Quentin Durward, the arrow of the Royal Guard
 1990 — Afghan Breakdown
 1991 — Ay! Train Robbery
 1991 — Shtemp
 1993 — The Tragedy of the Century
 2003 — Operational Alias
 2005 — Red Square
 2004-2013 — Kulagin and Partners
 2005 — Star of the Era
 2005 — Gold Field
 2006 — Wolfhound
2008 — Paradise Apples
2009 — Bankrupt
 2014 — Kuprin. Pit
  2014 —  Ekaterina

Sound in video games
 2005 — Tom Clancy's Splinter Cell: Chaos Theory —  Irving Lambert, NSA 
 2006 — Tom Clancy's Splinter Cell: Double Agent —  Irving Lambert, NSA

References

External links
 
 Biography 

1940 births
Living people
People from Kirensky District
Russian male actors
Soviet male actors
Russian male voice actors
People's Artists of the RSFSR
Honored Artists of the RSFSR